Netball Singapore, founded in 1962, is the national body for netball in Singapore. In 2002, the Association was named a merit sport by the Singapore Sports Council. In 1999, Netball Singapore established the Netball Super League with six teams competing to emerge as Champion. This opens up an exchange for players from different clubs, ages and skillsets.

The body also controls the Singapore national team.

External links
 

Sing
Netball in Singapore
Netball
1962 establishments in Singapore
Sports organizations established in 1962
Sin